Rhaphispermum is a monotypic genus of flowering plants belonging to the family Orobanchaceae. The only species is Rhaphispermum gerardioides.

Its native range is Madagascar.

References

Orobanchaceae
Orobanchaceae genera
Monotypic Lamiales genera